The fourth Constitution of Senegal (Constitution de la République du Sénégal) was adopted in a 2001 referendum.

History 
Senegal has previously had three other constitutions: in 1959, 1960, and in 1963.

References

External links
Constitution of Senegal
Constitution de la République du Sénégal 

Politics of Senegal
Senegal